The Russellville Miners were a Minor League Baseball team that represented Russellville, Alabama in the Alabama-Tennessee League in 1921.

External links
Baseball Reference

Baseball teams established in 1921
Sports clubs disestablished in 1921
Professional baseball teams in Alabama
Defunct Alabama-Tennessee League teams
1921 establishments in Alabama
1921 disestablishments in Alabama
Defunct baseball teams in Alabama
Baseball teams disestablished in 1921